Serge Delaive (born 1965 in Liège, Belgium) is a poet and novelist writing in the French language. His first novel, Café Europa, made a strong impression on critics. Additionally, his photographs have been featured in exhibitions in Liège (CP-CR), Herstal (City Museum), Amay (Maison de la poésie) and Paris (Librairie Wallonie-Bruxelles, Librairie Itinéraires), Asnières and Padova (Europoems Symposium).

Published works

Poetry books

Légendaire, Editions Les Eperonniers, coll. Feux, Bruxelles, 1995.
Monde jumeau, Editions Les Eperonniers, coll. Feux, Bruxelles, 1996.
Par l'oeil blessé, L'Arbre à paroles, Amay, 1997.
Revolver, Editions de l'Acanthe, Namur/Bruxelles, 1999.
Le livre canoë, Editions de la Différence, coll. Clepsydre, Paris, 2001.
En rade, Décharge/Gros textes, coll. Polder n°129, Toucy/Châteauroux-les-Alpes, 2006.
Les jours followed by Ici là, Editions de la Différence, coll. Clepsydre, Paris, 2006 (Marcel Thiry Prize 2007).
Poèmes sauvages, Maelström éditions, coll. Bookleg n°30, Bruxelles, 2007.
Le sexe des boeufs, Tétras Lyre, coll. Accordéon, Soumagne, 2008, with an original drawing by Robert Varlez.
Une langue étrangère, L'Arbre à paroles, Amay, 2008, with an original drawing by Marilu Nordenflycht.
Art farouche, Editions de la Différence, coll. Clepsydre, Paris, 2011.
Meuse fleuve nord, poem & photographs, Le Tétras Lyre, Liège, 2014.
La Trilogie Lunus, anthology, L'Arbre à paroles, Amay, 2015.

Novels
Café Europa, Editions de la Différence, Paris, 2004. (Indications Prize 2005). Paperback : Espace Nord, Bruxelles, 2012.
L'homme sans mémoire, Editions de la Différence, Paris, 2008.
Argentine, Editions de la Différence, Paris, 2009. (Rossel Prize 2009)Prix Rossel.

Nonfiction
Paul Gauguin, étrange attraction, essay, L'Escampette, Chauvigny, 2011.
Pourquoi je ne serai pas français, Maelström, coll. Bookleg N°79, Bruxelles, 2011.
Herstal, texts and photographs, Musée de Herstal, Herstal, 2011.
Carnet de Corée, travel accounts, texts and photographs, Editions de la Différence, Paris, 2012.

In anthologies and magazines
La poésie belge, by Alain Bosquet in Nota Bene, n° 41-42-43, printemps 1993, Paris, pp. 291–300.
Hrvatsko Slovo, newspaper, 19 January 2001, Zagreb, p. 13
 La poésie francophone de Belgique, by Wener Lambersy, Le Cherche Midi éditeur, Paris, 2002, p. 205.
Poésie1/Vagabondages, n°29, La nouvelle poésie de langue française, Le Cherche Midi éditeur, 2002, Paris, pp. 34–37.
Knjinzevna Rijeka, n°3, 7th year, chapters of Le temps du rêve translated in Croatian by Ivana Šojat, December 2002, Rijeka, pp. 58–62.
Encore une journée/Ein Weiterer Tag, bilingual anthology German/French by Rüdiger Fischer, Verlag Im Wald, Rimbach, 2002, pp. 54–67.
Señas de identidad, bilingual anthology Spanish/French by Sergio Rodriguez, Ediciones Vitruvio, Madrid, 2003, pp. 67–89.
Ici on parle français & flamand, une fameuse collection de poèmes belges, by Francis Dannemark, Le Castor Astral, coll. Escales du Nord, 2005, Brussels and Bordeaux, p. 71.
Ceci n’est pas une poésie, een Belgische-Franstalige anthologie, by Benno Barnard, uitgeverij Atlas, Amsterdam, 2005, pp. 539–540.
Europa Erlesen, Zwischen Fels und Nebel, European anthology by Kevin Perryman et Lojze Wieser, Wieser Verlag, Klagenfurt/Celovec, 2006, p. 155.
Poètes aujourd’hui, un panorama de la poésie francophone de Belgique, anthology by Liliane Wouters and Yves Namur, Taillis Pré/Le Noroît, Namur/Montreal, 2007.
L'année poétique 2008, Seghers, Paris, 2008.
Bélgica - Seis poetas belgas jóvenes de lengua francesa, anthology by Laura Calbrese and Alejo Steimberg, Vox Ediciones, Bahía Blanca, Argentina, 2009.
L'année poétique 2009, Seghers, Paris, 2009.
El Jabali, Buenos Aires, 2009.
...

References

External links
 His website
 From the website Mot à Mot
 From the website bon à tirer
 On the website of the Éditions de la Différence
 On the website Culture, le magazine littéraire de l'Université de Liège
 http://promethee.philo.ulg.ac.be/engdep1/MotAMot/motfstrt.html Site Mot à Mot
 http://www.bon-a-tirer.com/auteurs/delaive.html On the site bon à tirer
 http://arquivo.pt/wayback/20090717235039/http://www.ladifference.fr/fiches/auteurs/delaive.html  On the site of the Editions de la Différence

1965 births
Living people
Writers from Liège
Belgian poets in French
Belgian male poets